Scythris heinemanni is a flower moth of the family Scythrididae and it is included in the knochella species group. It is found in mainland of France and Italy.

The wingspan is about 15 mm. Adults are on wing in June, July and August.

The larvae feed on Origanum vulgare and Silene nutans.

References

[Bengtsson B., 1997 - Microlepidoptera of Europe 2: 1-301, Stenstrup]

External links

Fauna Europaea

heinemanni
Moths of Europe
Moths described in 1869